This is an incomplete list of world-famous or notable Circassians, including both full Circassians and people of at least 50% Circassian descent. Figures who belong in two categories (i.e. a military officer who is also a politician) have only been placed in one of the categories. In previous usage, the term Circassian also included the Abkhazians.

Cultural
(* = Circassian descent only on paternal side)

(** = Circassian descent only on maternal side)

Cultural figures

 Tevfik Esenç – Last known fully competent speaker of the Ubykh language.

Historians and writers 

 Hayriye-Melech Xhundj – One of the first woman Circassian writers
 Nâzım Hikmet** – Poet, playwright, novelist, screenwriter, director and memoirist.
 Amirkhan Kamizovich Shomakhov – lyrics, prose, and play writer, primarily known as one of the founders of the Kabardian children's literature.
 Ahmed Shawqi – Egyptian Poet-Laureate.
 Kuba Shaaban – Writer, poet, musician, and historian.
 Betal Khabekhirov – Folk writer.
 Hasan Cemal** – Turkish journalist, historian and writer
 Nadine Jolie Courtney – American journalist and author of Beauty Confidential and All-American Muslim Girl
 Mohydeen Izzat Quandour – Writer, intellectual, film producer and director, and musician
 Amjad M. Jaimoukha – One of the most influential Circassian writers and publicists.

Military officers

Ancient 

 Hekataios of Sindike – king of the Sindians throughout the reign of both Satyros I and Leukon I, rulers of the Bosporan Kingdom.
 Oktamasades of Sindike – king of the Sindians. usurped the throne from his father some time in 383 BC after his failed war against Oktamasades's mother, Tirgatao.

1st-17th century

Kings of Circassia 

 Inal the Great – Supreme Prince (King) of Circassia from 1427 to 1453 who unified all Circassians (then divided into several princedoms) into one state.

Kings of Kabardia 

 Idar of Kabardia – Supreme Prince of Kabardia. He was the son of Prince Inarmaz, and the grandson of Prince Tabula. Prince Inarmaz himself was the eldest of the three grandsons of Prince Inal. His rule spanned over the period of 1525 to 1540.
 Temryuk of Kabardia –  Supreme Prince of Kabardia. When Temryuk came to power, he put down the revolts of the disputing princes, and helped Circassia become a military power within the North Caucasus.
 Kurgoqo Atajuq – Supreme Prince of Kabardia who won the Battle of Kanzhal.
 Jankhot Qushuq – Last Supreme Prince of Kabardia.

Safavid people 
 Yusuf Agha – Safavid gholam and courtier who wielded great influence and power during the reign of king Abbas I.
 Qazaq Khan Cherkes - Safavid military commander who also served as the governor of Shirvan (1624–1633) and Astarabad (1639–1640)
 Farhad Beg Cherkes - Safavid military commander
 Behbud Khan Cherkes - Safavid military commander
 Fereydun Khan Cherkes - Safavid military commander who served as the governor of Astarabad
 Najafqoli Khan Cherkes - Safavid military commander who served as the governor of Shirvan and Erivan

18th-19th century

Russo-Circassian War participants 
 Shuwpagwe Qalawebateqo – politician and military commander who served as the 1st leader of the Circassian Confederation from 1807 to 1827.
 Ismail Berzeg – military commander and politician who served as the 2nd leader of the Circassian Confederation from 1827 to 1839. He was also the princely leader of the Ubykh tribe.
 Seferbiy Zaneqo – military commander and diplomat who served as the 5th leader of the Circassian Confederation from 1859 to 1860.
 Qerandiqo Berzeg – military commander who served as the 6th and last leader of the Circassian Confederation from 1860 to 1864. After the Circassian genocide, he was exiled to the Ottoman Empire, volunteered in the Ottoman army against Russia, and died there of old age.
 Kizbech Tughuzhuqo – military commander who took part in the Russo-Circassian War. Personally witnessing all of his family get killed by the Russian army, he received multiple offers from the Russian Empire to switch sides and join its Imperial ranks but he refused all offers and closed negotiations.
 Jembulat Boletoqo – military commander, politician, nobleman and leader of the Temirgoy region. He was famous for his courage and tough will. He had great influence among all Circassians, including the Abadzekhs, with whom he was associated with.
 Qerzech Shirikhuqo – military commander and the leader of the Natukhaj region.
 Psheqo Akhedjaqo – politician, military commander and nobleman.
 Ale Khirtsizhiqo – military commander from the Abdzakh region.

20th-21st century

Ottoman military officers 
 Çerkes Ethem – guerilla leader, social bandit, efe and soldier. Nicknamed the "Rankless General" by his supporters and crowned as the "National Hero" by Mustafa Kemal Atatürk, he initially gained fame for establishing the Kuva-yi Seyyare and putting down multiple great-scale rebellions and gaining key major victories against the Greek armies invading Anatolia during the Turkish War of Independence.
 Yusuf Izzet Pasha - a general of the Ottoman Army and the Turkish Army.
 Suleyman Askeri Pasha - Ottoman soldier and co founder of the Teşkilât-ı Mahsusa (Special Organisation)
 Yakub Cemil – Ottoman revolutionary and soldier, who assassinated Nazım Pasha during the 1913 Ottoman coup d'état.

Turkish military officers 
 Cemil Cahit Toydemir – Officer of the Ottoman Army and a general of the Turkish Army.
 Ali Sait Akbaytogan – General of the Turkish Army
 Ismail Hakkı Berkok - General of Mountainous Republic, Turkish and Ottoman armies

Egyptian military officers 
 Salah Salem – an Egyptian Military officer and member in the Egyptian Revolutionary Command Council
 Gamal Salem – an Egyptian Air Force officer and political figure
 Hussein el-Shafei – an Egyptian Military officer and member in the Egyptian Revolutionary Command Council
 Zakaria Mohieddin – an Egyptian Military officer and member in the Egyptian Revolutionary Command Council
 General officer Aziz Almasri – an Egyptian Military officer

Libyan military officers 
 Umar Muhayshi – member of the Libyan Revolutionary Command Council that ruled Libya.

Syrian military officers 
 Bassam Abdel Majeed – Syrian military officer, politician and diplomat.

Jordanian military officers 
 Major General Ibrahim Pasha Othman Kashoqa – 1st commander of the Royal Jordanian Air Force (1956–1962)
 Hero of Samu Incident Lieutenant General Ihsan Pasha Shurdom −9th commander of the Royal Jordanian Air Force (1983–1993), his Hawker Hunter Jet Fighter still presented in the entrance of the Martyr's Monument in Amman, Jordan
 Major General Awni Pasha Belal −10th commander of the Royal Jordanian Air Force (1993–1994)
 Major General Hussein Pasha Ahmad Shodash Shapsoug – 16th commander of the Royal Jordanian Air Force (2006–2010)
 Major General Mansour Pasha Hakouz Bgane – Shapsig – commander of southern region
 Major General Izzat Pasha Quandour −9th commander of the Jordanian public security directorate (1969–1970)
 Lieutenant General Anwar Pasha Mohammed −12th commander of the Jordanian public security directorate (1971–1976)
 Major General Mamoun Pasha Khalil Ha'opsh −14th commander of the Jordanian public security directorate (1979–1981)
 Lieutenant General Mohammad Pasha Idris Dodokh −15th commander of the Jordanian public security directorate (1981–1984)
 Lieutenant General Thyab Pasha Yousef −16th commander of the Jordanian public security directorate (1984–1985)
 General officer Tahseen Pasha Shordum −22nd commander of the Jordanian public security directorate (2002–2004)
 General officer Tareq Pasha Ala'Eddin Bersik −7th commander of the Jordanian General Intelligence Department.

Athletes

Football and basketball 

 Altay Bayındır – Professional footballer who plays as goalkeeper
 Emre Belözoğlu  – Football manager and former professional footballer who played as a midfielder
 Şamil Çinaz – Professional footballer who plays as a midfielder
 Can Bartu – Former professional basketball and football player and pundit
 Ayetullah Bey – Former professional footballer, founder and second president of the major Turkish multi–sport club Fenerbahçe SK
 Süleyman Seba – Ex–President of Beşiktaş J.K.
 Oğuz Çetin –  football manager and former player.
 Mesut Bakkal – professional football manager and former midfielder.
 Feras Esmaeel – footballer
 Yanal Abaza – former footballer
 Tamer Haj Mohamad – footballer
 Bibras Natcho – Footballer, former captain of the Israel under-19 football team
 Izhak Nash – Footballer who played in the Israeli Premier League
 Nili Natkho – Basketball player who played for Maccabi Raanana and Elitzur Ramla

Martial arts 

 Mahmut Atalay – Wrestler, 1968 Olympic Gold medalist.
 Aslanbek Khushtov – wrestler, who has won a gold medal in the 2008 Summer Olympics.
 Hamit Kaplan – Wrestler, 1956 Olympic Gold medalist.
 Yaşar Doğu – 1948 London Olympics middleweight wrestling champion.
 Sefer Baygin – 1972 Europe wrestling champion.
 Bilyal Makhov – Mixed Martial Artist and 2012 Olympic Bronze medalist in freestyle wrestling
 Beslan Mudranov – Judo, 2016 Olympics gold medalist
 Celal Atik – wrestler and coach. He had his best achievements in the freestyle, winning gold medals at the 1948 Olympics, 1951 World and 1946 and 1949 European championships.
 Fuat Balkan – fencer who competed at the 1924 and 1928 Summer Olympics.
 Sefer Baygın – wrestler who won the European Wrestling Championships.
 Gazanfer Bilge – wrestler who won the gold medal in the Featherweight class of Men's Freestyle Wrestling at the 1948 Olympics.
 Adil Candemir – wrestler. He was born in Amasya. He won a silver medal in freestyle wrestling, middleweight class, at the 1948 Summer Olympics in London.

Theologians and philosophers

Islamic clergy 

 Caner Dagli - Islamic scholar and associate professor of Religious Studies at the College of the Holy Cross in Worcester, Massachusetts. 
 Jawdat Said – Islamic scholar and nonviolence advocate.
 Muhammad Zahid al-Kawthari – Islamic scholar and the adjunct to the last Shaykh al-Islam of the Ottoman Empire.

Christian clergy 

 Carlo de' Medici** – Italian priest. A member of the powerful Medici family, he became a senior clergyman and collector.

Philosophers 

 Jabagh Qazanoqo – philosopher, poet, military strategist, and diplomat who gained fame for reforming the Circassian justice system based on the Quran and Adyghe Xabze. He played a big role in the Battle of Kanzhal.

Politicians

Jordanian politicians 

 Sa`id Al-Mufti Habjoka – Jordanian independent politician, serving in several governments as interior minister (1944–1945, 1948–1950, 1951–1953 and 1957). He was Minister of Finance in 1945. He served as the President of the Senate of Jordan from December 1956 to July 1963 and from November 1965 to November 1974.
 Ahmad Husni Hatuqey – general of the General Intelligence Directorate (Jordan).
 Ismael Babouk – The first Mayor of Jordan's capital, Amman (1909–1911).
 Toujan al-Faisal – Human rights activist, member of Jordanian Parliament 1993–1997, first woman ever elected to the parliament.

German politicians 

 Cem Özdemir* – German politician, co–chairman of the German Green Party.

Syrian politicians 

 Ali Mamlouk – Director of general security of Syria
 Bassam Abdel Majeed – former Syrian interior minister and director of the military police.

Prime ministers of Libya 

 Abdul Majid Kubar – Prime Minister of Libya (1957–1960).

Prime ministers of Iraq 

 Tahir Yahya – prime minister of Iraq.
 Hikmat Sulayman – prime minister of Iraq.

Tunisian politicians 

 Rashid al-Shakir Sahib al-Taba'a – Tunisian politician born around 1790 and died 11 September 1837.

Prime ministers of Tunisia 

 Khaireddin al Tunusy – Prime Minister of Tunisia 1873–1877.

Egyptian politicians 

 Aziz Ali al-Misri – Egyptian chief of staff and politician.
 Khaled Mohieddin – Egyptian politician.

Prime ministers of Egypt 

 Ali Mahir Pasha – Prime Minister of Egypt
 Mahmoud Fawzi – Prime Minister of Egypt
 Ahmad Mahir Pasha – Prime Minister of Egypt 
 Riyad Pasha – Prime Minister of Egypt

Turkish politicians 

 Abdüllatif Şener – Former Finance Minister in the 54th cabinet of the Turkish Government
 Ali Kemal** –  journalist-politician who was killed during the Turkish War of Independence.
 Deniz Baykal –  politician who was a long–time leader of the Republican People's Party (CHP) in Turkey.

Presidents and prime ministers of Turkey 

 Ahmet Necdet Sezer – 10th president of Turkey.
 Ali Fethi Okyar – diplomat, military officer and the second Prime Minister of Turkey (1924–1925).
 Necmettin Erbakan** – politician, engineer, and academic who was the Prime Minister of Turkey from 1996 to 1997. as mandated by the constitution.
 Nazım Ekren – Deputy Prime Minister of Turkey. who was responsible for economic affairs.

Grand viziers of the Ottoman Empire 

 Cenaze Hasan Pasha – Short–term Ottoman grand vizier in 1789. His epithet Cenaze (or Meyyit) means "corpse" because he was ill when appointed to the post.
 Koca Dervish Mehmed Pasha – Ottoman military officer and statesman from Circassia. He was made Kapudan Pasha (Grand Admiral) in 1652 and promoted to Grand Vizier on 21 March 1653. He held the position until 28 October 1654.
 Çerkes Mehmed Pasha – Served as Grand Vizier of the Ottoman Empire from 1624 to 1625.
 Özdemiroğlu Osman Pasha – Ottoman statesman and military commander who also held the office of grand vizier.
 Mahmud Shevket Pasha –  Ottoman generalissimo and statesman, who was an important political figure during the Second Constitutional Era.
 Salih Hulusi Pasha - was one of the last Grand Viziers of the Ottoman Empire, under the reign of the last Ottoman Sultan Mehmed VI, between 8 March 1920 and 2 April 1920.

Ottoman governors 

 Abdullah Pasha -  the Ottoman governor (wali) of Sidon Eyalet. During his reign, all of Palestine and the Syrian coastline came under his jurisdiction.
 Çerkes Osman Pasha -  served as the wali (governor) of the Sidon and Damascus eyalets (provinces) in the early 18th century.
 Farrukh Pasha -  Ottoman governor of Nablus and Jerusalem in the early 17th century, and founder of the Farrukh dynasty, which held the governorship of Nablus and other posts for much of the 17th century.

Heads of the federal subjects of Russia

Presidents of Adygea 

 Aslan Dzharimov – The 1st President of the Republic of Adygea
 Hazret Sovmen – The 2nd President of the Republic of Adygea
 Aslan Tkhakushinov – The 3rd President Republic of Adygea
 Murat Kumpilov – The 4th President Republic of Adygea

Presidents of Kabardino–Balkaria 

 Valery Kokov – The 1st President of Kabardino-Balkaria
 Arsen Kanokov – The 2nd President of Kabardino-Balkaria

Economists

 Ungku Abdul Aziz* – Malaysian economist and lecturer.
 Zeti Akhtar Aziz* – Governor of Bank Negara Malaysia, Malaysia's Central Bank.

Nobility

Royal families 

 The Babouk and Qala families are two of the few Circassian aristocratic families left in Jordan that descend from the 'warq' social class in Circassia.
 Burji dynasty of Egypt.

Sultans of the Ottoman Empire with Circassian mothers 

 Abdulhamid II** – reigned as the 34th Sultan of the Ottoman Empire - the last Sultan to exert effective control over the fracturing state.
 Mehmed V** – reigned as the 35th and penultimate Ottoman Sultan.
 Mehmed VI** – the 36th and last Sultan of the Ottoman Empire.

Shahs of the Safavid Empire with Circassian mothers 

 Shah Abbas II** – the seventh Shah of Safavid Persia
 Shah Suleiman I** – the eight Shah of Safavid Persia

Other nobility

 Maria Temryukovna – Wife of the Russian Tsar Ivan the Terrible
 Bidar Kadın - fourth wife of Sultan Abdul Hamid II of the Ottoman Empire.
 Ecaterina Cercheza second wife of Moldavian prince Vasile Lupu
 Sultana Melek Tourhan was the wife of Sultan Hussein Kamel of Egypt.
 Princess Sana Asem – Jordanian princess
 Dina bint 'Abdu'l-Hamid** – former Queen of Jordan as the first wife of King Hussein,
 Shahnaz Pahlavi** – daughter of Iran's last king Mohammad Reza Pahlavi and his first wife Fawzia of Egypt
 Princess Fawzia – Queen consort of Iran and the first wife of Mohammad Reza Pahlavi
 Mihrimah Sultan** – granddaughter of Kamures Kadın
 Şehzade Mustafa** – Ottoman prince as the eldest son of Sultan Suleiman the Magnificent
 Shamkhal Sultan – Safavid noble
 Nakihat Khanum – Safavid noble
 Anna Khanum – Safavid noble
 Sultan-Agha Khanum – Safavid noble
 Bedrifelek Kadın - second wife and chief consort of Sultan Abdul Hamid II of the Ottoman Empire.
 Mahidevran Hatun - concubine of ottoman sultan Suleiman the Magnificent

Artists

Film, TV, and stage

 Asuman Krause – actress, singer, model and TV presenter who was crowned Miss Turkey in 1998.
 Rushdy Abaza – Egyptian actor. He was a member of the wealthy Abaza family. He was considered one of the most charming actors in the Egyptian film industry. He died of brain cancer at the age of 53.
 Ali İhsan Varol – TV show presenter, producer, and actor.
 Mert Fırat – actor and screenwriter
 Hussein Fahmy – Egyptian Actor
 Mervat Amin – Egyptian actress
 Najdat Anzour – Syrian television and film director.
 Ludmilla Tchérina – internationally famous ballet dancer, actress, artist and sculptor who is a member of a royal family.
 Mehmet Aslantuğ – actor, director, producer, and screenwriter. He has received a Golden Boll Award, a Golden Objective Award, three Golden Orange Awards, and four Golden Butterfly Awards.
 Seda Alkor – actress, beauty pageant titleholder, painter, and singer famous for her tall height, natural blonde hair, fair skin, and light green eyes.
 Mimi Chakib–an Egyptian actress who appeared in some 15 films mostly in the 1940s and 1950s
 Mehmet Oz** – American surgeon who hosts the TV program "The Dr.Oz show".
 Damla Sönmez – Theatre, cinema and TV actress. Best known for her roles in Bir Aşk Hikayesi, Güllerin Savaşı and Çukur.
 Elçin Sangu – actress known for her role in "Kiralık Aşk".
 Natalia Azoqa – Contestant on "Survivor: David vs. Goliath."
 Filiz Akın* – actress, writer and TV presenter. Known as Yeşilçam Turkish cinema's "noble, modern, urban and elegant face", Filiz Akın won a huge fan base in Turkey.
 Neslihan Atagül – actress best known for her role in Kara Sevda (2015–2017), one of the most successful Turkish series, sold to more than 110 countries and the only winner of the International Emmy Award in 2017.
 İrem Sak – actress and singer.
 Ezel Akay – film actor, film director and film producer.
 Sezgi Sena Akay – actress, former professional volleyball player, presenter, and model who was crowned Best Model of the World 2012.
 Deniz Akkaya – top model, presenter, fashion editor and disc jockey, entrepreneur, businesswoman, and actress who won Best Model of Turkey 1997. As the top–earning model in Turkey in the early 2000s, Deniz Akkaya is considered to be one of the most leading models in Turkish fashion history, and one of the most beautiful women of the country.
 Kanbolat Görkem Arslan – actor
 Günseli Başar – beauty contestant and columnist who was crowned Miss Turkey 1951 and  Miss Europe 1952.
 Orhan Boran – radio/TV host and actor. He was also widely known for his laudable usage of the Turkish language.
 Begüm Birgören – actress.
 Sanem Çelik – actress, artist and dancer.
 Sadi Celil Cengiz – actor.
 Meltem Cumbul – actress.
 Keriman Halis Ece – beauty pageant titleholder, pianist, and fashion model who won the Miss Turkey 1932 title. She was also crowned Miss Universe 1932 in Spa, Belgium and thus became Turkey's first Miss Universe.

Musicians and painters

 Astemir Apanasov – singer
 Yuri Temirkanov – Russian music director and chief conductor of the Saint Petersburg Philharmonic since 1988.
 Zamudin Guchev – craftsman and musician.
 Aslan Tlebzu – Russian folk musician.
 Sati Kazanova – Russian singer.
 Emanne Beasha- Jordanian/American singer
 Hadise – singer.
 Zaur Tutov – singer.
 Türkan Şoray – singer.
 Mihail Chemiakin – Famous painter, stage designer, sculptor and publisher.
 Avni Arbaş – painter
 Aydilge – writer, poet and singer–songwriter who is famous for her beauty and voice.
 Nuri Bilge Ceylan – photographer, cinematographer, screenwriter and actor and film director best known for the Palme d'Or winning Winter Sleep (2014).

See also
Circassians

References

Circassians
Circassians